Liga THB-KFA is an amateur level football league in Kedah, Malaysia. The league is managed by the football authority in Kedah, the Kedah Football Association (KFA). As part of a sponsorship deal with THB Maintenance SDH BHD, the Liga KFA was renamed the Liga THB-KFA. The league is at level 4 of the Malaysian football league system.

Teams from this division, as well as from the Malaysia M4 League, enter the FAM Cup and FA Cup at the first qualifying round. The champions from this league automatically go to the M3 League play-off round.

Champions
2019 : Suka Menanti FC

References

External links
 Official Website

4
Malay